Heartbeat is the fourth studio album by Chinese singer G.E.M., released on 6 November 2015, by Hummingbird Music.

Track listing
All songs are written by G.E.M. and produced by Lupo Groinig.

Charts

References

External Links 
 

2015 albums
G.E.M. albums
Mandopop albums